The Australind is a rural passenger train service in Western Australia operated by Transwa on the South Western Railway between Perth and Bunbury.

History

The Australind service began on 24 November 1947 and was hauled initially by U class steam locomotives. It was named to commemorate the city of that name envisioned by Marshall Waller Clifton on Leschenault Inlet 100 years previously. The current hamlet of Australind, a satellite town of Bunbury, has never had a passenger rail service, nor even a railway line.

In February 1958, X class diesel locomotives took over. The service was relaunched on 1 October 1960 with onboard catering removing the need for an elongated stop at Pinjarra. On 16 November 1987, the current ADP/ADQ class railcars took over the service reducing journey times to 2 hours 30 minutes.

Rolling stock

When introduced, the train consisted of new carriages built by the Midland Railway Workshops. In August 1985, Westrail awarded Comeng, Bassendean a contract for five Westrail ADP/ADQ class railcars, three ADPs with driving cabs and two ADQs, using a similar body shell and interior fitout to the New South Wales XPT carriages. Each carriage was powered by a Cummins KTA19 coupled to a Voith transmission. They usually operate as a three or four carriage set. Five carriage set operation is not possible due to the limited platform length available at Perth station.

In July 2003, the DMUs were painted in a new livery in line with the formation of Transwa. In 2007, the DMUs were painted white as part of a refurbishment program. In 2010/11, new seats were fitted. Two new Australind trains, each consisting of a three-car set,  to 2023 for a cost of $54 million Australian dollars. The new diesel-multiple-units will be built by Alstom in Bellevue as part of the $1.25 billion Australian dollar contract to deliver 246 Transperth C-series carriages.

Route
The Australind departs from Perth traversing the metropolitan Armadale line to Armadale, then the South Western Railway to Bunbury.

Stations
Perth
Armadale
Byford
Mundijong
Serpentine
North Dandalup
Pinjarra
Waroona
Yarloop
Cookernup
Harvey
Brunswick Junction
Bunbury

Ridership
The Australind had 60,507 passengers in the year leading up to June 2022.

See also
 AvonLink
 MerredinLink
 The Prospector (train)

References

External links

Perth Trains gallery (archived)

Named passenger trains of Western Australia
Railway services introduced in 1947
1947 establishments in Australia